The 2019 Beijing Sinobo Guoan F.C. season is the team's 16th consecutive season in the Chinese Super League since the league's founding in the 2004, and 29th consecutive season in the top flight of Chinese football. They compete in the Chinese Super League, Chinese FA Cup, Chinese FA Super Cup and AFC Champions League. They qualified for the AFC Champions League for the first time since the 2015 season, but failed to advance from the group stage.

The team qualified for next year's AFC Champions League by securing at least a 2nd place finish in the Chinese Super League on November 26, 2019 after a 4-1 away victory against Guangzhou R&F. The team finished in 2nd place, scoring 70 points, the highest point tally in Guoan's history and as 2nd place in Chinese Super League.

First team
As of 31 July 2019

Transfers

Winter

Transfers in

Transfers out

Summer

Loan in

Staff

|}

Friendlies

Pre-season

Competitions

Chinese Super League

Table

Results by round

Matches

Chinese FA Cup

Chinese FA Super Cup

AFC Champions League

Group stage

Statistics

Appearances and goals

{| class="wikitable sortable plainrowheaders" style="text-align:center"
|-
! rowspan="2" |
! rowspan="2" |
! rowspan="2" style="width:75px;" |
! rowspan="2" style="width:180px;" |Name
! colspan="2" style="width:180px;" |Chinese Super League
! colspan="2" style="width:180px;" |Chinese FA Cup
! colspan="2" style="width:180px;" |Chinese FA Super Cup
! colspan="2" style="width:180px;" |AFC Champions League
! colspan="2" style="width:180px;" |Total
|-
!
!Goals
!
!Goals
!
!Goals
!
!Goals
!
!Goals
|-
|1
|GK
|
! scope="row" |Hou Sen

|1
|0

|0
|0

|0
|0

|0
|0

!1
!0
|-
|2
|DF
|
! scope="row" |Kim Min-jae

|25(1)
|0

|1(1)
|0

|0
|0

|6
|0

!32(2)
!0
|-
|3
|DF
|
! scope="row" |Yu Yang

|6(6)
|0

|3
|1

|0
|0

|0(2)
|0

!9(8)
!1
|-
|4
|DF
|
! scope="row" |Li Lei

|18
|0

|1
|0

|1
|0

|5
|0

!25
!0
|-
|5
|MF
|
! scope="row" |Renato Augusto

|30
|15

|0(1)
|0

|1
|0

|6
|1

!37(1)
!16
|-
|6
|MF
|
! scope="row" |Chi Zhongguo

|21(5)
|0

|0(1)
|0

|1
|0

|5
|0

!27(6)
!0
|-
|7
|MF
|
! scope="row" |Hou Yongyong

|2(14)
|1

|2
|1

|0(1)
|0

|0
|0

!4(15)
!2
|-
|8
|MF
|
! scope="row" |Piao Cheng

|14(4)
|2

|1
|0

|1
|0

|2
|0

!18(4)
!2
|-
|9
|FW
|
! scope="row" |Zhang Yuning

|19(6)
|8

|1
|0

|0
|0

|3(3)
|0

!23(9)
!8
|-
|10
|MF
|
! scope="row" |Zhang Xizhe

|23(1)
|2

|0
|0

|1
|0

|5
|1

!29(1)
!3
|-
|11
|MF
|
! scope="row" |Fernando

|4(3)
|0

|0
|0

|0
|0

|0
|0

!4(3)
!0
|-
|14
|GK
|
! scope="row" |Zou Dehai

|28
|0

|2
|0

|0
|0

|6
|0

!35
!0
|-
|15
|DF
|
! scope="row" |Liu Huan

|2(1)
|0

|2
|0

|0
|0

|1(1)
|0

!5(2)
!0
|-
|16
|DF
|
! scope="row" |Zheng Yiming

|0
|0

|0(1)
|0

|0
|0

|0
|0

!0(1)
!0
|-
|17
|FW
|
! scope="row" |Cédric Bakambu

|14(2)
|10

|3
|3

|1
|0

|6
|3

!25(2)
!16
|-
|18
|MF
|
! scope="row" |Jin Taiyan

|10(3)
|0

|1(2)
|0

|0
|0

|0(1)
|0

!11(6)
!0
|-
|19
|FW
|
! scope="row" |Yu Dabao

|25
|4

|1
|0

|1
|0

|6
|0

!33
!4
|-
|20
|FW
|
! scope="row" |Wang Ziming

|10(16)
|7

|1(1)
|0

|0(1)
|0

|1(2)
|0

!12(20)
!7
|-
|21
|MF
|
! scope="row" |Jonathan Viera

|17
|8

|1
|0

|1
|0

|5
|0

!24
!8
|-
|22
|GK
|
! scope="row" |Yang Zhi

|0
|0

|0
|0

|0
|0

|0
|0

!0
!0
|-
|23
|MF
|
! scope="row" |Li Ke

|21(4)
|2

|1(1)
|0

|0
|0

|0
|0

!22(5)
!2
|-
|24
|DF
|
! scope="row" |Zhang Yu

|1(1)
|0

|1
|0

|0
|0

|0(1)
|0

!2(2)
!0
|-
|25
|GK
|
! scope="row" |Guo Quanbo

|1(1)
|0

|1
|0

|1
|0

|0
|0

!3(1)
!0
|-
|26
|MF
|
! scope="row" |Lü Peng

|4(7)
|0

|3
|0

|1
|0

|2(1)
|0

!10(8)
!0
|-
|27
|FW
|
! scope="row" |Wang Gang

|25
|0

|2
|0

|0
|0

|4(1)
|0

!31(1)
!0
|-
|28
|DF
|
! scope="row" |Jiang Tao

|3(1)
|0

|0
|0

|1
|0

|2
|0

!6(1)
!0
|-
|29
|MF
|
! scope="row" |Ba Dun

|2(7)
|1

|2
|0

|0
|0

|1(3)
|1

!5(10)
!2
|-
|30
|DF
|
! scope="row" |Lei Tenglong

|4(2)
|0

|3
|0

|0
|0

|0
|0

!7(2)
!0
|-
|32
|MF
|
! scope="row" |Liu Guobo

|0(4)
|0

|0(1)
|0

|0
|0

|0
|0

!0(5)
!0
|-
|33
|GK
|
! scope="row" |Ma Kunyue

|0
|0

|0
|0

|0
|0

|0
|0

!0
!0
|-
|39
|FW
|
! scope="row" |Wen Da

|0
|0

|0
|0

|0
|0

|0
|0

!0
!0
|-
|40
|DF
|
! scope="row" |Wang Congming

|0
|0

|0
|0

|0
|0

|0
|0

!0
!0
|-
|}

Top scorers

Top assists

Clean sheets

Discipline

References

Beijing Guoan F.C. seasons
Beijing Sinobo Guoan F.C.